Vasilchenko is a Ukrainian surname, derived from Vasily, the Ukrainian equivalent of the given name Basil. Notable people with the surname include:

 Alexei Vasilchenko (born 1981), Kazakhstani ice hockey player
 Georgy Vasilchenko (1921–2006), Russian sexologist
 Liliya Vasilchenko (born 1962), Soviet cross-country skier
 Olga Vasilchenko (born 1956), Russian rower
 Yury Vasilchanka (born 1994), Belarusian hammer thrower

See also
 

Ukrainian-language surnames
Patronymic surnames
Surnames from given names